Little Hands Clapping, is a novel by British author Dan Rhodes, published in 2010 by Canongate. Its title comes from a line in Robert Browning's poem The Pied Piper of Hamelin.

Plot introduction
The novel centres around a bizarre German museum dedicated to suicide; Herr Schmidt, its grim grey curator; and the respectable Doctor Ernst Frölicher and his shocking secret.

Various characters appear with short lifestories including the Luciano Pavarotti-obsessed founder of the museum and her Pavarotti-lookalike husband, Hulda the cleaner who believes she is doomed to Hell, and Madalena the suicidal Portuguese student.

Reception
"Totally sick and brilliant, He sucks you into his world. I loved it." Douglas Coupland
"Almost every page of Little Hands Clapping has superb quirks or asides which will have the reader laughing. A sublime, brilliant novel", The Scotsman
"It should please cynical idealists and idealistic cynics alike." Financial Times

References

External links
Little Hands Clapping at author's website
Dan Rhodes's novel about a museum dedicated to suicide is by turns witty and gruesome review from The Guardian
A mixture of the quaint, the sweet and the distinctly unpleasant, review from The Guardian by Colin Greenland
review from The Independent
"I don't feel like a natural" interview at The Skinny
Five books that loomed large while I was writing Little Hands Clapping

2010 British novels
British Gothic novels
Novels set in Germany
Novels about museums
Fiction about suicide
Works by Dan Rhodes
Canongate Books books